Physaria arctica is a perennial flowering herb in the family Brassicaceae, known by the common name arctic bladderpod.

Description
Plants are  6–12 cm high with a short taproot and woody stem-base. Basal leaves, 2–6 cm and arranged in a rosette predominate, and are obovate to oblanceolate, while cauline leaves, sessile or shortly petiolate, are oblanceolate or lingulate and 0.5-1.5 cm. Inflorescences are loosely racemose, with flower stalks ascending or erect and 5–20 mm. There are 3-8 radially symmetrical flowers per inflorescence, and the petals are spaulate, 5-6mm, with blades that narrow gradually to the claw.

Habitat
Physaria arctica grows in sand and gravel from calcareous bedrock, river bars and terraces, cliff ledges, scree and talus slopes.

References

arctica